Branko Zorko (born 1 July 1967) is a Croatian retired middle distance runner who specialized in the 1500 metres. Zorko competed in the 1500 metres in five Olympic Games, from 1988 to 2004, making it through to the semi-finals in 1992 and 1996. He won bronze medals at the 1993 World Indoor Championships in Toronto and the 1994 European Championships in Helsinki. In 1992 he was awarded the Franjo Bučar State Award for Sport. He was born in Hodošan.

Running career

Early career
On November 20, 1984, Zorko ran his first ever race, which he won on a cross country course at the age of 17. Less than a year into training, he posted a time of 8:30 for 3000 meters and won a competitive high school race called Kros Sportskih Novosti. He declined offers to train with AK Crvena Zvezda and instead remained in Križevci, where he did intervals on a track only once a week. The rest of his training took place on forest trails, where Zorko alleged that bystanders would ask him why he was running and tell him to "take a hoe and dig out some corn".

International
At his first major international competition, Zorko finished sixth in the men's 3000 metres race at the 1989 IAAF World Indoor Championships. In 1990, he won his first major medal, winning bronze at the European Indoor Championships in Glasgow. After the breakup of Yugoslavia, Zorko began specializing in middle-distance disciplines, and eventually found his talent in the 1500 metres. In 1992, Zorko won the first international medal for the newly independent Croatia, winning a bronze medal at the 1992 European Indoor Athletics Championships. A year later he won the bronze medal for the men's 1500 metres at the 1993 IAAF World Indoor Championships, finishing only 0.39 seconds behind winner Marcus O'Sullivan. Next year, Zorko finished second in the 1500 at the 1994 European Athletics Indoor Championships, and third at the 1994 European Championships in Athletics.

At the 1997 IAAF World Indoor Championships and at the 2002 European Indoor Athletics Championships, he finished in fourth place in the respective 1500 metre races.

Pacemaking
By the late 1990s, Zorko was increasingly suffering from injuries, which prompted him to turn to professional pacemaking. As a pacemaker, he assisted in setting several world records, both indoors and outdoors, most notably for Haile Gebrselassie. On July 11, 2005, Zorko announced his retirement at the IAAF Grand Prix Zagreb.

Personal bests
.

Outdoors

Indoors

International competitions

References

External links
 
 
 Croatian National Records - Men
 Croatian National Records - Indoors
 Krizevci.eu: Branko Zorko

Croatian male middle-distance runners
Olympic athletes of Croatia
People from Međimurje County
Sport in Međimurje County
Olympic athletes of Yugoslavia
Athletes (track and field) at the 1988 Summer Olympics
Athletes (track and field) at the 1992 Summer Olympics
Athletes (track and field) at the 1996 Summer Olympics
Athletes (track and field) at the 2000 Summer Olympics
Athletes (track and field) at the 2004 Summer Olympics
1967 births
Living people
Franjo Bučar Award winners
European Athletics Championships medalists
Mediterranean Games silver medalists for Croatia
Mediterranean Games medalists in athletics
Athletes (track and field) at the 1997 Mediterranean Games